The  red-faced malkoha (Phaenicophaeus pyrrhocephalus) is a member of the cuckoo order of birds, the Cuculiformes. This malkoha species is endemic to Sri Lanka

Description

This is a large species at 46 cm with a long graduated tail. Its back is dark green, and the uppertail is green edged with white. The belly and undertail are white, the latter being barred black. The crown and throat are black, and the lower face white. There is a large red patch around the eye and the bill is green. Sexes are similar, but juveniles are much duller.

The red-faced malkoha takes a variety of insects including caterpillars, giant stick insects, mantises and small vertebrates such as lizard. It occasionally may eat berries but this needs confirmation.

Unlike most cuckoos, this is a quiet species, making only the odd soft grunt.

Distribution
It is endemic to Sri Lanka although some old records have apparently erroneously referred to its presence in southern India. According to Baker (1934), it is found in the 'South of Travancore, where it was obtained by Stewart together with its nests'. Later, Biddulph reported a red-faced malkoha in Madurai district, southern Tamil Nadu. Thilo Hoffmann later pointed out that this record would not stand up to a modern records committee, and it is now best disregarded.

The presence of red-faced malkoha in the island is largely confined to the Sinharaja Forest Reserve and the surrounding vegetation, which is one of the biodiversity hotspots in the world.

Habitat
The red-faced malkoha is a bird of dense forests, where it can be difficult to see despite its size and colour.

Breeding biology
It nests in a tree, the typical clutch being 2-3 eggs.

Behaviour
They are found in nearly half of the mixed-species foraging flocks in the Sinharaja area.

In culture
The common name for this species malkoha is the vernacular name for the bird in Sinhala language. 'Mal-Koha' translates to 'flower-cuckoo'. The red-faced malkoha appears in a 5 rupee Sri Lankan postal stamp.

References

External links 
 BirdLife Species Factsheet.
 Photographs from the Oriental Bird Club
 Lesser known bird

red-faced malkoha
Endemic birds of Sri Lanka
red-faced malkoha
Taxa named by Thomas Pennant